Senator Kunkel may refer to:

George Kunkel (1893–1965), Pennsylvania State Senate
Jacob Michael Kunkel (1822–1870), Maryland State Senate
John Christian Kunkel (1816–1870), Pennsylvania State Senate